Carl-Olof Anderberg (March 13, 1914 in Stockholm – January 4, 1972 in Malmö, Sweden) was a Swedish pianist, composer and musical arranger. From 1940, he was married to the actress Lizzie Stein.

Selected works
Concertante
 Concerto for viola and orchestra (1945)

Film music
 Night in Port (1943)
 Sonja (1943)
 En dag skall gry - 1944 (A Day Shall Dawn)
 Främmande hamn - 1948 (Strange Harbour)
 She Came Like the Wind (1952)
 U-Boat 39 (1952)
 Encounter with Life (1952)
 House of Women (1953)
 Café Lunchrasten (1954)(US title: The Lunch-Break Café)
 Voyage in the Night (1955)

External links
 Carl-Olof Anderberg at the Swedish Music Information Centre
 

1914 births
1972 deaths
Swedish classical composers
Swedish male classical composers
Swedish classical pianists
Male classical pianists
20th-century classical composers
20th-century classical pianists
20th-century Swedish male musicians
20th-century Swedish musicians